Bijoy Sen is a Bangladeshi art director. He won Bangladesh National Film Award for Best Art Direction for the film Andha Biswas (1992).

Selected films
 Behula - 1966
 Anowara - 1967
 Ki Je Kori - 1976
 Nazma - 1983
 Awara - 1985
 Ashanti - 1986
 Rajlokkhi Srikanto - 1987
 Lalu Mastan - 1987
 Ranga Bhabi - 1989 
 Rajar Meye Bedeni - 1991
 Shongkhonil Karagar - 1992
 Ondho Bishwas - 1992
 Shopner Prithibi - 1996
 Uttarer Khep - 2000

Awards and nominations
National Film Awards

References

External links
 

Best Art Direction National Film Award (Bangladesh) winners
Bangladeshi art directors
Possibly living people
Year of birth missing (living people)
Living people